The Golden Slipper is a Russian fairy tale collected by Alexander Afanasyev in Narodnye russkie skazki.

It is Aarne-Thompson type 510A, the persecuted heroine.

Synopsis
An old man brought back two fish from the market for his daughters.  The older one ate hers, but the younger asked her fish what to do with it.  It told her to put it in water, and it might repay her; she puts it in the well.

The old woman, their mother, loved her older daughter and hated her younger.  She dressed up the older to take to Mass, and ordered the younger to husk two bushels of rye while they were gone.  She wept beside the well.  The fish gave her fine clothing and sent her off, husking the rye while she was gone.  The mother came back talking of the beauty they had seen at Mass.  She took the older daughter again, leaving the younger to husk three measures of barley and the younger went to Mass again with the fish's aid.  A king's son saw her and caught her slipper with some pitch.  He found the younger daughter and tried the shoe on her; when it fit, they married.

See also

Bawang Putih Bawang Merah
Cinderella
Fair, Brown and Trembling
Katie Woodencloak
Rushen Coatie
The Story of Tam and Cam
The Wonderful Birch

References
Alexander Afanasyev, Narodnye russkie skazki
Heidi Anne Heiner, "Tales Similar to Cinderella"

Golden Slipper
Russian fairy tales
ATU 500-559